Salvatoria pilkena is a species belonging to the phylum Annelida, a group known as the segmented worms. The species name comes from an Aboriginal word, pilkena, meaning "different", due to its characteristic features. Salvatoria pilkena belongs to a reduced group of species that possess rugose dorsal cirri, contrary to the typical spindle-shaped cirri found in its genus. It also lacks dorsal cirri on chaetiger 2. It resembles Salvatoria swedmarki and S. celiae, differing from pilkena in that the latter has significantly longer proventricles, while its compound chaetae are short and unidentate. At the same time, S. opisthodentata has a similar body and compound chaetae but appears to possess dorsal cirri on its chaetiger 2.

Description
Its prostomium is ovate, wider than its length, showing 4 eyes in a trapezoidal arrangement. Its antennae are somewhat spindle-shaped, small and rugose, its median antenna (inserted between its posterior eyes) having a similar length to the combined length or its prostomium and palps. Its lateral antenna is shorter and is inserted in front of its anterior eyes. The palps are shorter in length to the prostomium, being dorsally fused by a membrane and containing a distal notch.

It carries two ciliated nuchal organs between its prostomium and peristomium, the latter being similar in length to the adjacent segments. Its tentacular cirri and antennae are alike in length, the dorsal pair relatively the same in length to the lateral antennae. The species' dorsal cirri are rugose, present on all chaetigers except 2, with those of chaetiger 1 being slightly longer. Its ventral cirri are short and digitiform.

Its parapodia end in 3 distinct rounded papillae. It shows smooth shafts and bidentate blades within compound chaetae, both teeth acute, its subdistal tooth shorter than its distal one, whose long spines are directed upwards; on the bases of the longer blades, the distal half of their margins are either smooth or provided with small spines. Its anterior parapodia count with about 6 compound chaetae, exhibiting dorsoventral gradation in length, being 24µm above and 8 µm below; longer blades count with a double curvature. Posterior parapodia have 4 compound chaetae each. The simple dorsal chaetae from chaetiger 1 is smooth, slender and unidentate. Salvatoria pilkena shows ventral simple chaetae only on most posterior chaetigers, which are sigmoid, smooth and bidentate. Its acicula is solitary and acuminate.

The pharynx is long, spanning through approximately 4 segments. Its pharyngeal tooth is small. Its proventricle is similar in length to the prostomium, spanning 3 segments, with about 18 muscle cell rows. Its pygidium is small, with 2 anal cirri, similar to its dorsal cirri.

Distribution
Salvatoria pilkena is known to inhabit tidal mud- and sandflats in Hinchinbrook Channel, Queensland, and is thought to inhabit an extended area of the Queensland coast.

References

Further reading

External links

WORMS entry

Syllidae